Joy Springer is an American politician serving as a member of the Arkansas House of Representatives from the 34th district. A Democrat, she won a special election to succeed John W. Walker and assumed office in March 2020.

Early life and education 
Springer was born in Ouachita County, Arkansas. She earned a Bachelor of Science degree in business administration from Henderson State University, followed by a Bachelor of Science in elementary education and a Master of Education from the University of Arkansas at Little Rock.

Career 
Springer is an office manager and paralegal. She was first elected to the Arkansas House of Representatives in a March 4, 2020 special election, succeeding John W. Walker, who died in office. She is a life member of the NAACP.

Personal life 
Springer is a member of the African Methodist Episcopal Church.

References 

Living people
Democratic Party members of the Arkansas House of Representatives
African-American state legislators in Arkansas
Women state legislators in Arkansas
People from Ouachita County, Arkansas
Henderson State University alumni
University of Arkansas at Little Rock alumni
Year of birth missing (living people)
21st-century African-American people
21st-century African-American women